Judith of Bavaria may refer to:

 Judith of Bavaria (died 843), wife of Louis the Pious
 Judith, Duchess of Bavaria (born 925), wife of Henry I of Bavaria
 Judith of Bavaria, Duchess of Swabia (1103–1131), wife of Frederick II, Duke of Swabia